Svojanovský, Svoyanovsky or Svoyanovski is a Slavic masculine surname, its feminine counterpart is Svojanovska or Svoyanovskaya. It may refer to:

 Oldřich Svojanovský (born 1946), Czech rower
 Pavel Svojanovský (born 1943), Czech rower, brother of Oldřich

Slavic-language surnames